Shanghai MOONTON Technology Co. Ltd., commonly known as MOONTON Games, is a Chinese multinational video game developer and publisher owned by the Nuverse subsidiary of ByteDance and based in Shanghai, China. It is best known for the mobile multiplayer online battle arena (MOBA) game Mobile Legends: Bang Bang  released in July 2016.

History
MOONTON Games was founded in 2015. The company was initially called YoungJoy Technology Limited, and it is headquartered in Shanghai, China.

MOONTON Games' first video game, the tower defense (TD) game Magic Rush: Heroes, was released on 6 April 2015. Mobile Legends: Bang Bang began development following the completion of Magic Rush: Heroes. Mobile Legends was released as Mobile Legends: 5v5 MOBA in 2016, and became popular in Southeast Asia, notably in Indonesia and Malaysia, where it was the most-downloaded free mobile game app among iPhone users in 2017. The game is distributed by Elex Tech in the United States.

Products

Video games

Television series

Notes
Riot Games suspected that Mobile Legends: 5v5 MOBA infringed on the intellectual property League of Legends, and demanded that Google remove the game from Google Play and App Store. MOONTON Games removed the game before Google could act and eventually relaunched it as Mobile Legends: Bang Bang on 9 November 2016. In July 2017, Riot Games filed a lawsuit against MOONTON Games over copyright infringement, citing similarities between Magic Rush and Mobile Legends against League of Legends. The case was dismissed by Central District Court of California in the United States on account of forum non-conveniens.

Tencent, the parent of Riot Games, followed with a separate lawsuit in Shanghai No.1 Intermediate People's Court against Xu Zhenhua - previously a senior Tencent employee - for violating non-competition agreements.

On 22 March 2021, the developer of TikTok, BABE, Resso and Lark ByteDance, through its video game subsidiary Nuverse, acquired MOONTON Games for  billion. ByteDance reportedly won over a bid from Tencent.

Mobile Legends: Bang Bang is a minor revision of Mobile Legends: 5v5 MOBA, but was considered a separate product in the 44-page lawsuit filed by Riot Games against MOONTON Games.

References

ByteDance
2014 establishments in China
Companies based in Shanghai
Video game companies established in 2014
Video game companies of China
2021 mergers and acquisitions